Gary D. Foster is a British phytopathologist.

Education 
Foster was educated at Banbridge Academy from 1976-1983. Foster then read microbiology at Queen's University Belfast, graduating in 1986. Four years later, he received a doctorate from the same institution. Foster completed postdoctoral research at the University of Leicester.

Career 
In 1996, Foster began teaching at the University of Bristol. Foster founded the journal Molecular Plant Pathology in 2000, serving as chief editor through 2012. Foster was elected a fellow of the Royal Society of Biology in 2011.

References

British phytopathologists
Living people
Alumni of Queen's University Belfast
Academic journal editors
Academics of the University of Bristol
Fellows of the Royal Society of Biology
Year of birth missing (living people)